Eledone schultzei, the brush-tipped octopus, is a rare species of octopus. It has previously been known by other taxonomic names (synonyms) including Eledone thysanophora and Aphrodoctopus schultzei.

Distribution
It is found off the South African coast from Saldanha Bay to Table Bay in less than 10m of water.

Description
The brush-tipped octopus has a round body with eight arms and no shell. Its arms have one row of suckers.

Ecology
Its habits are mostly unknown, but it feeds on small crustaceans.

References

schultzei
Molluscs described in 1910
Taxa named by William Evans Hoyle